Elie Kaunfer (b. 1973) is an American rabbi and serves as president and CEO of Yeshivat Hadar in Manhattan. Kaunfer has been named as a leading American rabbi by The Forward and Newsweek.

Career 
Elie Kaunfer received a doctorate from the Jewish Theological Seminary of America, his dissertation concerned Jewish liturgy. Kaunfer was a co-founder and served as the executive director of Mechon Hadar (Hadar Institute), also known as Yeshivat Hadar. He also was a co-founder of the independent minyan Kehilat Hadar which is affiliated with the institute. Additionally, he served as a fellow at the Avi Chai Foundation. Aside from his rabbinic role at Hadar, Kaunfer worked in journalism and banking.

Publications 
Kaunfer co-authored a book with Jonathan Sarna on the rise of independent Jewish congregations and their contribution to building Jewish communities:
 Empowered Judaism: What Independent Minyanim Can Teach Us about Building Vibrant Jewish Communities (Jewish Lights, 2010).

Other publications include:
 Kaunfer, E. (2019) Applying Jewish Wisdom to Philanthropy: The Case of Aggripas and the Sages, Journal of Jewish Education 85(4), 349-361.

See also 
 Shai Held
 Ethan Tucker

References

American Conservative Jews
Living people
Conservative rosh yeshivas
Place of birth missing (living people)
1973 births